London Buses route 142 is a Transport for London contracted bus route in London and Hertfordshire, England. Running between Watford Junction station and Brent Cross bus station, it is operated by Metroline.

History

Route 142 was introduced by the London General Omnibus Company in March 1914.

The allocation was transferred to London Country Bus Services' Watford garage, and became part of London Country North West in 1986. It was included in the sale of the business to Luton & District in October 1990 and retained the contract shortly afterwards, ordering 15 new Leyland Olympians to operate the route. The route was retained again in 1995, making it the first route to be retained by its existing operator through two consecutive retenders.

When re-tendered, it was retained by Arriva The Shires with new contracts commencing on 5 January 2008 and 5 January 2013.

Current route
Route 142 operates via these primary locations:
Watford Junction station  
Watford High Street station 
Bushey station  
Bushey Heath
Stanmore station 
Edgware bus station  
Burnt Oak Broadway
Colindale
West Hendon Broadway
Brent Cross bus station

References

External links

Bus routes in London
Transport in the London Borough of Barnet
Transport in the London Borough of Brent
Transport in the London Borough of Harrow
Transport in Hertfordshire